Perth—Wellington is a provincial electoral district in Ontario, Canada, that has been represented in the Legislative Assembly of Ontario since the 2007 provincial election.

It was created in 2003 from parts of Dufferin—Peel—Wellington—Grey, Perth—Middlesex and Waterloo—Wellington ridings.

It consists of the County of Perth, and the Town of Minto and the townships of Mapleton and Wellington North in the County of Wellington.

Members of Provincial Parliament

Election results

2007 electoral reform referendum

Sources

Elections Ontario Past Election Results
Map of riding for 2018 election

Ontario provincial electoral districts
Stratford, Ontario